Edith Mathis (born 11 February 1938) is a Swiss soprano and a leading exponent of the works of Wolfgang Amadeus Mozart worldwide. She is known for parts in Mozart operas, but also took part in premieres of operas such as Henze's Der junge Lord.

Her voice was featured in a key scene of the film The Shawshank Redemption, joining with that of Gundula Janowitz in a duet from Le Nozze di Figaro, "soar[ing] over a prison yard, signifying joy and hope in a world of despair," as described in a 2014 article in The New York Times.

Career 
Mathis was born and studied in Lucerne, and made her operatic debut in 1956 as the second boy in Die Zauberflöte. She continued gaining stage experience in her native Switzerland for the next three years. Her first appearance abroad was at the Cologne Opera in 1959. In the early 1960s she made frequent guest appearances in Hamburg, at the Glyndebourne Festival, and the Salzburg Festival. In 1963, she became a member of the Deutsche Oper Berlin. She made her debuts at Covent Garden and the Met in 1970. The 1970s saw her appear in great opera houses of Europe: the Vienna State Opera, the Bavarian State Opera, and the Opéra de Paris.

In addition to her operatic career, Mathis made numerous concert tours in Lieder recitals, including tours to Japan, the US, Australia, Russia, and Israel. She recorded Mahler's Second Symphony several times under Rafael Kubelik and Klaus Tennstedt, and the Fourth Symphony, singing the Finale's "The Heavenly Life" with the Vienna Philharmonic under Leonard Bernstein (1972) and the Berlin Philharmonic under Herbert von Karajan (1979), both for Deutsche Grammophon.

Mathis also became a sought-after teacher.

Repertory 

Parts of Mozart operas were one of her specialties, with her roles including Cherubino in Le nozze di Figaro, Zerlina in Don Giovanni, Despina in Così fan tutte and Pamina in Die Zauberflöte. She recorded the latter role in 1980, opposite Karin Ott and Janet Perry, under Herbert von Karajan. Other roles she sang include Sophie and the Marschallin in Der Rosenkavalier by Richard Strauss and Agathe and Ännchen in Weber's Der Freischütz.

Mathis also sang in the premieres of Gottfried von Einem's Der Zerrissene, Henze's Der junge Lord, Heinrich Sutermeister's Le roi Berénger, and Menotti's Help, Help, the Globolinks! She was also a singer of oratorios and Lieder.  Her Lieder recordings include Volume 21 of the complete songs of Franz Schubert for Hyperion Records. She recorded Mahler's Symphony No. 4 under Karajan in 1979, and was also filmed in 1972 in a performance with the Vienna Philharmonic and Leonard Bernstein.

Several of her most notable recorded roles in Mozartian opera include Susanna in Le nozze di Figaro for the Deutsche Oper Berlin with Karl Böhm conducting, as well as Ilia in Idomeneo with the Staatskapelle Dresden. A re-released recording of Don Giovanni with the Vienna Philharmonic and Karl Böhm from the 1977 Salzburg Festival features her in one of her best-known roles, Zerlina. A performance by Mathis as Cherubino is available on a DVD from the Salzburg Festival of 1966, with the Vienna Philharmonic under Böhm, where she sings alongside Ingvar Wixell, Claire Watson, Reri Grist, and Walter Berry.

Mathis' part of Susanna in "Sull'aria...che soave zeffiretto", a duet from The Marriage of Figaro, with the Austrian soprano Gundula Janowitz, features prominently in the film The Shawshank Redemption.

Personal life
Mathis was married to conductor and pianist Bernhard Klee, with whom she often performed. She lives in her native Switzerland.

Awards
 Mozart Medal of the International Mozarteum Foundation Salzburg (1976)
 Hans-Reinhart-Ring (1978)
  (1978)
 Bayerische Kammersängerin (1980)
 Buxtehude-Preis des Lübecker Senats (1981)
 Prix Mondial du Disque (Montreux)

Discography
 Bach solo cantatas (BWV 202, 51, 99, 106) – Karl Richter, Peter Schreier, Wolfgang Gönnenwein conductors
 Brahms: Volkslieder, Volks-Kinderlieder, 1975, Edith Mathis soprano, Peter Schreier tenor, Karl Engel piano. Deutsche Grammophon
 Brahms: Liebeslieder, Walzer op. 52, Neue Liebeslieder, Walzer op. 65 and 3 Quartette op. 64, 1981, Edith Mathis, Brigitte Fassbaender, Peter Schreier, Dietrich Fischer-Dieskau; Karl Engel and Wolfgang Sawallisch piano Deutsche Grammophon 
 Mozart Lieder – 1986, Karl Engel, piano
 Mozart Lieder – 1973, Bernhard Klee, piano
 Schumann Lieder – Christoph Eshenbach, piano
 Lieder Mozart-Schumann
 Franz Schubert Lieder
 Haydn Arias – 1981, Armin Jordan, conductor
 Handel Neun Deutsche Arien – 1966, Consortium Musicum
 Handel/Mozart Der Messias
 Richard Strauss & Hugo Wolf Lieder
 Exsultate, Jubilate, Geistliche Arien für Sopran – 1979, Bernhard Klee, conductor 
 Johann Sebastian Bach: Bach cantatas, 75 Kantaten, Münchener Bach-Chor, Münchener Bach-Orchester, conductor Karl Richter, Teldec & Archiv 1959–1979
 Johann Sebastian Bach: Matthäus-Passion ("St Matthew Passion"), 1979, Edith Mathis, Janet Baker, Peter Schreier, Dietrich Fischer-Dieskau, Matti Salminen, Regensburger Domspatzen Münchener Bach-Chor und -Orchester, conductor Karl Richter. Archiv Produktion
 Ludwig van Beethoven: Fidelio as Marcellina, 1969, St. Lukaskirche Dresden, Staatskapelle Dresden, Rundfunkchor Leipzig, conductor Karl Böhm. Deutsche Grammophon
 Hector Berlioz: La damnation de Faust as Marguerite, 1973, Symphony Hall, Boston, Boston Symphony, Tanglewood Festival Chorus, Boston Boy Choir, conductor Seiji Ozawa. Deutsche Grammophon
 Johannes Brahms: Ein deutsches Requiem, 1972, London Philharmonic, Edinburgh Festival Chorus, conductor Daniel Barenboim. Deutsche Grammophon
 Haydn: Die Schöpfung ("The Creation"), 1980, Edith Mathis, Aldo Baldin, Dietrich Fischer-Dieskau, Chorus and Academy of St Martin in the Fields, conductor Neville Marriner. Philips
 Haydn: Die Schöpfung ("The Creation"), 1983, Edith Mathis, Francisco Araiza, José van Dam, Wiener Singverein, Wiener Philharmoniker, conductor Herbert von Karajan (live recording) Deutsche Grammophon 
 Haydn: Die Jahreszeiten ("The Seasons"), 1981, Edith Mathis, Siegfied Jerusalem, Dietrich Fischer-Dieskau, Chorus and Academy of St Martin in the Fields, conductor Neville Marriner. Philips
 Gustav Mahler: Symphony No. 2, 1982, Edith Mathis, Doris Soffel, London Philharmonic Orchestra & Choir, conductor Klaus Tennstedt. EMI     
 W. A. Mozart: Requiem, 1963, New Philharmonia Orchestra & Chorus, conductor Rafael Frühbeck de Burgos. EMI
 W. A. Mozart: Requiem, 1971, Wiener Philharmoniker, Konzertvereinigung Wiener Staatsopernchor, conductor Karl Böhm. Deutsche Grammophon
 W. A. Mozart: "Le Nozze di Figaro", 1968, Susanna: Edith Mathis, Figaro: Hermann Prey, Countess Almaviva: Gundula Janowitz, Count Almaviva: Dietrich Fisher-Dieskau, Cherubino: Tatiana Troyanos, Chor und Orchester der Deutschen Oper Berlin, conductor Karl Böhm. Deutsche Grammophon
 W. A. Mozart: Grosse Messe KV427, 1963, Edith Mathis, Helen Donath, Theo Altmeyer, Franz Crass, Süddeutscher Madrigalchor, Südwestdeutsches Kammerorchester, conductor Wolfgang Gönnenwein. EMI  
 Otto Nicolai:  Die lustigen Weiber von Windsor (The Merry Wives of Windsor), 1976, Kurt Moll ( Falstaff ); Bernd Weikl ( Ford ); Siegfried Vogel (Mr. Page ); Peter Schreier ( Fenton ); Edith Mathis ( Mrs. Ford ); Hanna Schwarz ( Mrs. Page ); Helen Donath ( Anne ); Chor de Deutschen Staatsoper Berlin, Staatskapelle Berlin, conductor Bernhard Klee.  Berlin Classics
 Richard Strauss: Der Rosenkavalier as Sophie, 1969, Festspielhaus, Salzburg (live), Wiener Philharmoniker, Chor der Wiener Staatsoper, conductor Karl Böhm. Deutsche Grammophon
 In 1971 there was a new production of Die Zauberflöte at the Hamburg Opera directed by Sir Peter Ustinov. The production was filmed with, Tamino: Nicolai Gedda, Pamina: Edith Mathis, Sarastro: Hans Sotin, Königin der Nacht: Cristina Deutekom, Papageno: William Workman, Papagena: Carol Malone, Monostatos: Franz Grundheber, Speaker: Dietrich Fischer-Dieskau, Two Men in Armour: Helmut Melchert, Kurt Moll, conducted by Horst Stein (Arthaus DVD)

See also
 Haydn: Il mondo della luna (Antal Doráti recording)

References

External links
 
 Short Biography English
 Short Biography German
 Biography
 Mathis discography

1938 births
Living people
Swiss operatic sopranos
People from Lucerne
20th-century Swiss women opera singers
Deutsche Grammophon artists